The Battle of Harim (Harenc) was fought on 12 August 1164 at Harim, Syria, between the forces of Nur ad-Din, and a combined army from the County of Tripoli, the Principality of Antioch, the Byzantine Empire, and Armenia. Nur ad-Din won a crushing victory, capturing most of the leaders of the opposing army.

Background
In 1163, King Amalric I of Jerusalem led an invasion of Egypt, leaving the crusader states open to attack from the east. Nur ad-Din took advantage of this to invade Tripoli, but he was taken by surprise by a large combination of enemies at the Battle of al-Buqaia and was almost killed himself. He then moved north to Antioch, with assistance from his brother Qutb ad-Din in Mosul, his other vassals from Aleppo and Damascus, and the Ortoqids of the Jazira, and besieged the fortress of Harim (Harenc) in 1164. As William of Tyre says, "he stationed his engines around it in the customary manner and began to assault the place with a fury which permitted the inhabitants no rest."

Battle
Reginald of Saint Valery, lord of Harim, called for help, and Raymond III of Tripoli, Bohemund III of Antioch, and Joscelin III of Edessa arrived to relieve the siege. They were joined by Konstantinos Kalamanos, the Byzantine governor of Cilicia, and Thoros, and Mleh of Armenia, as well as Hugh VIII of Lusignan and Geoffrey Martel, brother of William VI of Angoulême, both of whom had recently arrived on pilgrimage.

Nur ad-Din prepared to give up the siege when they arrived, but the crusaders, inspired by the victory at al-Buqaia, and, "regardless of the rules of military discipline ... recklessly dispersed and roved hither and yon in pursuit of the foe." Nur ad-Din's troops defended against their charge and led a counterattack, pushing the crusaders into a swamp, and they were massacred "like victims before the altar."

It is possible that Nur ad-Din was only feigning a retreat in order to draw the crusaders into an ambush, but abandoning a siege when a relief army arrived was a standard tactic and Nur ad-Din presumably had no way of knowing the crusaders would follow him. William's assertion that this was a reckless move is further evidence of this. "Only the Armenian Thoros, who had  the Turkish maneuver and had not set off in pursuit, escaped from the disaster". Mleh also avoided capture. Konstantinos Kalamanos, Hugh, Raymond, Bohemund, and Joscelin were captured and imprisoned in Aleppo. According to Ibn al-Athir, 10,000 crusaders were killed.

Aftermath
Nur ad-Din resumed the siege and captured Harim a few days later. With Amalric absent in Egypt, all three crusader states were now without their rulers, but Nur ad-Din did not want to attack Antioch itself for fear of provoking a Byzantine response, as the Principality was technically an Imperial fief. To his critics he replied, "I would rather have Bohemund as a neighbor than the King of the Greeks!". Nur ad-Din went on to besiege and capture Banias. Amalric abandoned Egypt and marched north with Thierry of Alsace to relieve Nur ad-Din's pressure on Antioch. Bohemund was released from captivity in 1165 but Raymond remained in prison until 1173.

Notes

References

Further reading
Maalouf, Amin, The Crusades Through Arab Eyes, trans. Jon Rothschild. Al-Saqi, 1984.
Runciman, Steven, A History of the Crusades, vol. II: The Kingdom of Jerusalem. Cambridge University Press, 1952.
Smail, R. C. Crusading Warfare, 1097–1193. Cambridge University Press, 1956 (2nd ed., 1995). 
William of Tyre, A History of Deeds Done Beyond the Sea, trans. E.A. Babcock and A.C. Krey. Columbia University Press, 1943.

Battles of the Crusades
Battles involving the Seljuk Empire
Conflicts in 1164
1164 in Asia
Harim
Harim
1160s in the Crusader states
Battles involving the Zengid dynasty